Hakk may refer to:
Hakk-e Olya, a village in Markazi Province, Iran
Hakk-e Sofla, a village in Markazi Province, Iran